Paul Rimstead (1935 – 26 May 1987), born Andrew Paul Rimstad in Sudbury, Ontario, was a featured page 5 columnist for the Toronto Sun and sports writer.

Life and career

Born in Sudbury, Ontario, the "Rimmer" was described by peers as "legendary", "the Sun's resident character", and "a master storyteller". Rimstead began his journalism career at the age of 11, reporting on local farm births. A high school drop-out, Rimstead became a seasoned sports reporter, columnist, and writer.

He moved to Toronto at age 16.

In addition to the Toronto Sun, Rimstead also wrote for The Globe and Mail, the Toronto Daily Star, the Toronto Telegram, the Canadian Magazine, the Sudbury Star, the Kingston Whig-Standard, the Elliot Lake Standard, and other publications.

Bearing his name, the Toronto Sun Paul Rimstead Memorial Journalism Award is awarded annually to a second year Toronto Metropolitan University (the former Ryerson University) journalism undergraduate demonstrating academic excellence and financial need.

Rimstead ran for Mayor of Toronto in the 1972 Toronto municipal election as a publicity stunt. He placed fourth.

Rimstead hosted a short-lived late night television show on the Global Television Network in 1975 called Rimstead!. In the early 1980s he hosted a late night radio show on CJCL during the station's incarnation as a talk radio station.

In 1986, Rimstead married his long-time love, Myrna Sun (aka Miss C. Hinky).

He had one daughter and married twice.

Chronology
 1967 - Rimstead joins the Toronto Telegram
 1971 - Rimstead joins the Toronto Sun at its launch
 1972 - Rimstead runs for Mayor of Toronto, finishing fourth with 8,000 votes.
 1974 - Rimstead's first TV commercial for Carling O'Keefe Ale is named one of the world's best commercials.
 1975 - Rimstead hosts the short-lived, self-titled, late-night show, Rimstead!, for Global.

Publications
 Rimstead, Paul. Cocktails and Jockstraps, Prentice Hall Canada, 1981. 
 Rimstead, Paul.  Rimmer, dammit! : the life and times of Canadian legend Paul Rimstead, Toronto Sun, 1987.

References
Notes

Citations

1935 births
1987 deaths
Canadian columnists
Writers from Greater Sudbury
Ontario municipal politicians
Toronto Sun people